The Netherlands men's national under-20 basketball team is the national basketball team for under-20s in the Netherlands, administered by the Basketball Nederland. It represents the country in international men's under-20 basketball competitions.

FIBA U20 European Championship participations

See also
Netherlands men's national basketball team
Netherlands men's national under-18 basketball team
Netherlands women's national under-20 basketball team

References

External links
Archived records of Netherlands team participations

Basketball in the Netherlands
Basketball
Men's national under-20 basketball teams